Sunsweet is an unincorporated community in Tift County, in the U.S. state of Georgia.

History
The community was named for the local sun-ripened peach crop. A variant name was "Irby". A post office called Irby was established in 1890, and remained in operation until 1909.

References

Unincorporated communities in Georgia (U.S. state)
Unincorporated communities in Tift County, Georgia